Ecology Building Society is a building society in the United Kingdom. It was established in 1981, is based in West Yorkshire, and has over 10,000 open accounts. The Ecology is a member of the Building Societies Association.

The purpose of the Society is to achieve the greatest degree of environmental sustainability. It lends money to create and maintain sustainable housing stock, preferably with sustainable communities and green enterprise. Its funding is secured with the least degree of environmental degradation possible, and with the greatest degree of stakeholder endorsement obtainable.

History and purpose
The initial vision was to set up a building society that specialised in properties that conveyed an ecological benefit in terms of construction, use of land or lifestyle. The idea was sparked at a Green Party Conference, following the experience of a Yorkshire solicitor, David Pedley, who had great difficulty in finding anyone willing to give him a mortgage on a property needing extensive renovation. Ecology was founded by ten initial supporters who each invested £500, raising the £5000 capital which was the minimum required to start a building society at that time. Between 1981 and 1993 it was the smallest building society in the UK. By 2016 the society's mortgage lending had risen to £30.7 million and its savings balances to £163.1 million.

The primary purpose of the Society is to achieve the greatest degree of environmental sustainability by the application of its financial strength as can be achieved concomitant with the legal framework that the Society is subject to. This is achieved by lending activity primarily to foster the creation and maintenance of a sustainable housing stock, where possible in the context of sustainable communities, but also to support green enterprise, with this lending programme fed by funding secured with the least degree of environmental degradation possible, and with the greatest degree of stakeholder endorsement obtainable.

Ecology Building Society were the first building society awarded the Fair Tax Mark, in 2016.

Memorandum of the Society
This primary purpose is anchored in the Memorandum of the Society which contains a requirement "to promote…ecological policies designed to promote or enhance the environment in accordance with the principles of sustainable development". Sustainable development is defined as "Improving the quality of human life while living within the carrying capacity of supporting ecosystems".

Products
Ecology offers a range of mortgage products and lends throughout the UK. It specialises in renovation and new build mortgages on properties and projects that respect the environment. Where possible, mortgage pricing is aligned with the project's positive environmental impacts, in particular energy and carbon reduction, through its series of C-Change mortgage discounts. Ecology is particularly interested to see derelict and dilapidated property brought back into use. The Society supports the widespread application of Passivhaus building principles in the UK.

Ecology also offers a range of savings accounts including instant access accounts, a notice account and an Individual Savings Account (ISA), which allow individuals to fund the society's ecological lending programme. Mortgage and savings accounts can be managed online via the Ecology's website or by post.

See also
Ethical banking

References

External links

KPMG article

Building societies of England
Banks established in 1981
Organizations established in 1981
Ethical banking
Companies based in the City of Bradford
1981 establishments in the United Kingdom